Zita Hanrot (born 7 December 1989) is a French actress. She won the César Award for Most Promising Actress in 2016 for her role in the film Fatima.

Life and career
Zita Hanrot was born in 1989, to a Jamaican mother and a French father. She briefly studied history of art before enrolling at the Conservatoire national supérieur d'art dramatique, France's national drama academy based in Paris, in 2011; she graduated in 2014. Zita appeared in commercials such as the French army campaign (2006) alongside the French actor Karl E. Landler. She has cited the actress Béatrice Dalle as an inspiration, particularly for her role in the 1986 film Betty Blue.

Hanrot's first film role came in 2012 in Radiostars, directed by Romain Lévy, in which she plays the younger sister of Manu Payet. She subsequently played minor roles in The New Girlfriend (2013), and  Eden (2014). Her breakthrough role came in 2015's Fatima (2015), for which she was awarded the César Award for Most Promising Actress. In the film, directed by Philippe Faucon, she plays Nesrine, a medical student and the daughter of a north-African immigrant, determined to improve her position in life.

Her brother, Idrissa Hanrot, is also an actor, starring notably in the 2016 film Five.

Filmography

References

External links

 

1990 births
Living people
French actresses
French people of Jamaican descent
Actresses from Marseille
21st-century French actresses
Most Promising Actress César Award winners
French film actresses
French television actresses